The 1989–90 Gamma Ethniki was the seventh season since the official establishment of the third tier of Greek football in 1983. Proodeftiki and Anagennisi Giannitsa were crowned champions in Southern and Northern Group respectively, thus winning promotion to Beta Ethniki. Panargiakos and Kavala also won promotion as a runners-up of the groups.

Kerkyra, Anagennisi Arta, Rodos, Chalkida, Achaiki, Apollon Larissa, Alexandreia, Agrotikos Asteras, Achilleas Farsala and Aiginiakos were relegated to Delta Ethniki.

Southern Group

League table

Northern Group

League table

References

Third level Greek football league seasons
3
Greece